The 89th Academy Awards ceremony, presented by the Academy of Motion Picture Arts and Sciences (AMPAS), honored the best films of 2016, and took place on February 26, 2017, at the Dolby Theatre in Hollywood, Los Angeles, California, at 5:30 p.m. PST. During the ceremony, AMPAS presented Academy Awards (commonly referred to as Oscars) in 24 categories. The ceremony, televised in the United States by ABC, was produced by Michael De Luca and Jennifer Todd and directed by Glenn Weiss. Comedian Jimmy Kimmel hosted the ceremony for the first time.

In related events, the academy held its 8th Annual Governors Awards ceremony at the Grand Ballroom of the Hollywood and Highland Center on November 12, 2016. On November 25, 2016, the AMPAS announced that no anime shorts would be considered for this year's ceremony. On February 11, 2017, in a ceremony at the Beverly Wilshire Hotel in Beverly Hills, California, the Academy Scientific and Technical Awards were presented by hosts John Cho and Leslie Mann.

In the main ceremony, Moonlight won three awards including Best Picture—after La La Land was mistakenly announced as the winner—as well as Best Supporting Actor for Mahershala Ali. La La Land won six awards, the most for the evening, out of its record-tying 14 nominations, including Best Actress for Emma Stone and Best Director for Damien Chazelle. Hacksaw Ridge and Manchester by the Sea won two awards each with Casey Affleck winning Best Actor for the latter. Viola Davis won the Best Supporting Actress honor for Fences. The telecast was viewed by 33 million people in the United States.

Winners and nominees

The nominees for the 89th Academy Awards were announced on January 24, 2017, via global live stream from the academy. La La Land received the most nominations with a record-tying fourteen (1950's All About Eve and 1997's Titanic also achieved this distinction); Arrival and Moonlight came in second with eight apiece. La La Lands Best Picture loss to Moonlight meant it set a record for most nominations without winning Best Picture. Four of the five nominations for Best Original Score were by first-time nominees, the highest figure since 1967.

The winners were announced during the awards ceremony on February 26, 2017. Moonlight became the first film with an all-black cast and the first LGBT-themed film to win Best Picture. In an event unprecedented in the history of the Oscars, La La Land was incorrectly announced as the Best Picture, and, a few minutes later, the error was corrected and Moonlight was declared the winner. O.J.: Made in America, at 467 minutes, became the longest film to win an Academy Award, surpassing the 431-minute long War and Peace, which won the Academy Award for Best Foreign Language Film in 1969. Following the five-part documentary's win, new academy rules barred any "multi-part or limited series" from being eligible for documentary categories. With Casey Affleck winning the Oscar for Best Actor, he and his older brother, Ben Affleck, became the 16th pair of siblings to win Academy Awards. Mahershala Ali became the first Muslim actor to win an Oscar. Viola Davis became the first black person to achieve the Triple Crown of Acting with her Oscar, Emmy, and Tony wins.

At the age of thirty-two years and thirty-eight days, Damien Chazelle became the youngest person to win Best Director; Norman Taurog was only two hundred and twenty-two days older than Chazelle when he won Best Director for the 1931 comedy Skippy. Kevin O'Connell finally ended the longest losing streak in Oscar history after 20 unsuccessful nominations for sound mixing, winning for Hacksaw Ridge. Moonlights Dede Gardner became the first woman to win twice for producing, following her previous Best Picture win for 12 Years a Slave.

Awards 

Winners are listed first, highlighted in boldface, and indicated with a double dagger.

{| class=wikitable
|-
| style="vertical-align:top; width:50%;"|

 Moonlight – Adele Romanski, Dede Gardner and Jeremy Kleiner Arrival – Shawn Levy, Dan Levine, Aaron Ryder and David Linde
 Fences – Scott Rudin, Denzel Washington and Todd Black
 Hacksaw Ridge – Bill Mechanic and David Permut
 Hell or High Water – Carla Hacken and Julie Yorn
 Hidden Figures – Donna Gigliotti, Peter Chernin, Jenno Topping, Pharrell Williams and Theodore Melfi
 La La Land – Fred Berger, Jordan Horowitz and Marc Platt
 Lion – Emile Sherman, Iain Canning and Angie Fielder
 Manchester by the Sea – Matt Damon, Kimberly Steward, Chris Moore, Lauren Beck and Kevin J. Walsh
| style="vertical-align:top; width:50%;"|

 Damien Chazelle – La La Land
 Denis Villeneuve – Arrival
 Mel Gibson – Hacksaw Ridge
 Kenneth Lonergan – Manchester by the Sea
 Barry Jenkins – Moonlight
|-
| style="vertical-align:top; width:50%;"|

 Casey Affleck – Manchester by the Sea as Lee Chandler
 Andrew Garfield – Hacksaw Ridge as Desmond Doss
 Ryan Gosling – La La Land as Sebastian "Seb" Wilder
 Viggo Mortensen – Captain Fantastic as Ben Cash
 Denzel Washington – Fences as Troy Maxson
| style="vertical-align:top; width:50%;"|

 Emma Stone – La La Land as Amelia "Mia" Dolan
 Isabelle Huppert – Elle as Michèle Leblanc
 Ruth Negga – Loving as Mildred Loving
 Natalie Portman – Jackie as Jacqueline "Jackie" Kennedy
 Meryl Streep – Florence Foster Jenkins as Florence Foster Jenkins
|-
| style="vertical-align:top; width:50%;"|

 Mahershala Ali – Moonlight as Juan
 Jeff Bridges – Hell or High Water as Marcus Hamilton
 Lucas Hedges – Manchester by the Sea as Patrick Chandler
 Dev Patel – Lion as Saroo Brierley
 Michael Shannon – Nocturnal Animals as Detective Bobby Andes
| style="vertical-align:top; width:50%;"|

 Viola Davis – Fences as Rose Maxson
 Naomie Harris – Moonlight as Paula
 Nicole Kidman – Lion as Sue Brierley
 Octavia Spencer – Hidden Figures as Dorothy Vaughan
 Michelle Williams – Manchester by the Sea as Randi Chandler
|-
| style="vertical-align:top; width:50%;"|

 Manchester by the Sea – Kenneth Lonergan
 20th Century Women – Mike Mills
 Hell or High Water – Taylor Sheridan
 La La Land – Damien Chazelle
 The Lobster – Yorgos Lanthimos and Efthimis Filippou
| style="vertical-align:top; width:50%;"|

 Moonlight – Barry Jenkins; Story by Tarell Alvin McCraney;  Arrival – Eric Heisserer; 
 Fences – August Wilson 
 Hidden Figures – Allison Schroeder and Theodore Melfi; 
 Lion – Luke Davies; 
|-
| style="vertical-align:top; width:50%;"|

 Zootopia – Byron Howard, Rich Moore and Clark Spencer Kubo and the Two Strings – Travis Knight and Arianne Sutner
 Moana – John Musker, Ron Clements and Osnat Shurer
 My Life as a Zucchini – Claude Barras and Max Karli
 The Red Turtle – Michaël Dudok de Wit and Toshio Suzuki
| style="vertical-align:top; width:50%;"|

 The Salesman (Iran) in Persian – Directed by Asghar Farhadi Land of Mine (Denmark) in Danish – Directed by Martin Zandvliet
 A Man Called Ove (Sweden) in Swedish – Directed by Hannes Holm
 Tanna (Australia) in Nauvhal – Directed by Martin Butler and Bentley Dean
 Toni Erdmann (Germany) in German – Directed by Maren Ade
|-
| style="vertical-align:top; width:50%;"|

 O.J.: Made in America – Ezra Edelman and Caroline Waterlow 13th – Ava DuVernay, Spencer Averick and Howard Barish
 Fire at Sea – Gianfranco Rosi and Donatella Palermo
 I Am Not Your Negro – Raoul Peck, Rémi Grellety and Hébert Peck
 Life, Animated – Roger Ross Williams and Julie Goldman
| style="vertical-align:top; width:50%;"|

 The White Helmets – Orlando von Einsiedel and Joanna Natasegara 4.1 Miles – Daphne Matziaraki
 Extremis – Dan Krauss
 Joe's Violin – Kahane Cooperman and Raphaela Neihausen
 Watani: My Homeland – Marcel Mettelsiefen and Stephen Ellis
|-
| style="vertical-align:top; width:50%;"|

 Sing – Kristóf Deák and Anna Udvardy Ennemis intérieurs – Sélim Azzazi
 La femme et le TGV – Timo von Gunten and Giacun Caduff
 Silent Nights – Aske Bang and Kim Magnusson
 Timecode – Juanjo Giménez
| style="vertical-align:top; width:50%;"|

 Piper – Alan Barillaro and Marc Sondheimer Blind Vaysha – Theodore Ushev
 Borrowed Time – Andrew Coats and Lou Hamou-Lhadj
 Pear Cider and Cigarettes – Robert Valley and Cara Speller
 Pearl – Patrick Osborne
|-
| style="vertical-align:top; width:50%;"|

 La La Land – Justin Hurwitz Jackie – Mica Levi
 Lion – Dustin O'Halloran and Hauschka
 Moonlight – Nicholas Britell
 Passengers – Thomas Newman
| style="vertical-align:top; width:50%;"|

 "City of Stars" from La La Land – Music by Justin Hurwitz; Lyrics by Benj Pasek and Justin Paul "Audition (The Fools Who Dream)" from La La Land – Music by Justin Hurwitz; Lyrics by Benj Pasek and Justin Paul
 "Can't Stop the Feeling!" from Trolls – Music and Lyrics by Justin Timberlake, Max Martin and Karl Johan Schuster
 "The Empty Chair" from Jim: The James Foley Story – Music and Lyrics by J. Ralph and Sting
 "How Far I'll Go" from Moana – Music and Lyrics by Lin-Manuel Miranda
|-
| style="vertical-align:top; width:50%;"|

 Arrival – Sylvain Bellemare Deepwater Horizon – Wylie Stateman and Renée Tondelli
 Hacksaw Ridge – Robert Mackenzie and Andy Wright
 La La Land – Ai-Ling Lee and Mildred Iatrou Morgan
 Sully – Alan Robert Murray and Bub Asman
| style="vertical-align:top; width:50%;"|

 Hacksaw Ridge – Kevin O'Connell, Andy Wright, Robert Mackenzie and Peter Grace 13 Hours: The Secret Soldiers of Benghazi – Greg P. Russell, Gary Summers, Jeffrey J. Haboush and Mac Ruth
 Arrival – Bernard Gariépy Strobl and Claude La Haye
 La La Land – Andy Nelson, Ai-Ling Lee and Steven A. Morrow
 Rogue One: A Star Wars Story – David Parker, Christopher Scarabosio and Stuart Wilson
|-
| style="vertical-align:top; width:50%;"|

 La La Land – Production Design: David Wasco; Set Decoration: Sandy Reynolds-Wasco Arrival – Production Design: Patrice Vermette; Set Decoration: Paul Hotte
 Fantastic Beasts and Where to Find Them – Production Design: Stuart Craig; Set Decoration: Anna Pinnock
 Hail, Caesar! – Production Design: Jess Gonchor; Set Decoration: Nancy Haigh
 Passengers – Production Design: Guy Hendrix Dyas; Set Decoration: Gene Serdena
| style="vertical-align:top; width:50%;"|

 La La Land – Linus Sandgren Arrival – Bradford Young
 Lion – Greig Fraser
 Moonlight – James Laxton
 Silence – Rodrigo Prieto
|-
| style="vertical-align:top; width:50%;"|

 Suicide Squad – Alessandro Bertolazzi, Giorgio Gregorini and Christopher Nelson A Man Called Ove – Eva von Bahr and Love Larson
 Star Trek Beyond – Joel Harlow and Richard Alonzo
| style="vertical-align:top; width:50%;"|

 Fantastic Beasts and Where to Find Them – Colleen Atwood Allied – Joanna Johnston
 Florence Foster Jenkins – Consolata Boyle
 Jackie – Madeline Fontaine
 La La Land – Mary Zophres
|-
| style="vertical-align:top; width:50%;"|

 Hacksaw Ridge – John Gilbert Arrival – Joe Walker
 Hell or High Water – Jake Roberts
 La La Land – Tom Cross
 Moonlight – Nat Sanders and Joi McMillon
| style="vertical-align:top; width:50%;"|

 The Jungle Book'' – Robert Legato, Adam Valdez, Andrew R. Jones and Dan Lemmon
 Deepwater Horizon – Craig Hammack, Jason Snell, Jason Billington and Burt Dalton
 Doctor Strange – Stephane Ceretti, Richard Bluff, Vincent Cirelli and Paul Corbould
 Kubo and the Two Strings – Steve Emerson, Oliver Jones, Brian McLean and Brad Schiff
 Rogue One: A Star Wars Story – John Knoll, Mohen Leo, Hal Hickel and Neil Corbould
|}

Governors Awards
The academy held its 8th annual Governors Awards ceremony on November 12, 2016, during which the following awards were presented:

Academy Honorary Awards

 Jackie Chan  Hong Kong martial artist, actor, director, producer, and singer
 Anne V. Coates  British film editor
 Lynn Stalmaster  American casting director
 Frederick Wiseman  American filmmaker, documentarian, and theatrical director

Films with multiple nominations and awards

 Presenters and performers 
The following individuals, listed in order of appearance, presented awards or performed musical numbers.

 Presenters 

 Performers 

Ceremony information

Due to the mixed reception and low ratings of the previous year's ceremony, producers David Hill and Reginald Hudlin declined to helm the Oscar production. They were replaced by Michael De Luca and Jennifer Todd as producers. Actor and comedian Chris Rock told Variety regarding if he would return to host, "someone else will do it." On December 5, 2016, it was announced that Jimmy Kimmel would host the ceremony. Kimmel expressed that it was truly an honor and a thrill to be asked to host Academy Awards, commenting "Mike and Jennifer have an excellent plan and their enthusiasm is infectious. I am honored to have been chosen to host the 89th and final Oscars."

Due to his hosting duties, ABC did not broadcast a special episode of Jimmy Kimmel Live! following the ceremony, as in past years. Instead, ABC aired Live from Hollywood: The After Party, co-hosted by Anthony Anderson and Lara Spencer of Good Morning America. The stage set was designed by Derek McLane.

Box office performance of nominated films

At the time of the nominations announcement on January 24, 2017, the combined gross of the nine Best Picture nominees at the North American box offices was $483.8 million, with an average of $53.8 million per film. When the nominations were announced, Arrival was the highest-grossing film among the Best Picture nominees with $95.7 million in domestic box office receipts. La La Land was the second-highest-grossing film with $90.5 million, followed by Hidden Figures ($85 million), Hacksaw Ridge ($65.5 million), Fences ($48.8 million), Manchester by the Sea ($39 million), Hell or High Water ($27 million), Lion ($16.5 million) and Moonlight ($15.8 million). Moonlight became the second lowest-grossing film to win Best Picture award.

Thirty-five nominations went to 13 films on the list of the top 50 grossing movies of the year. Of those 13 films, only Zootopia (3rd), Moana (15th), La La Land (45th), and Arrival (48th) were nominated for Best Picture, Best Animated Feature or any of the directing, acting or screenwriting awards. The other top 50 box-office hits that earned nominations were Rogue One: A Star Wars Story (4th), The Jungle Book (5th), Fantastic Beasts and Where to Find Them (8th), Suicide Squad (10th), Doctor Strange (11th), Star Trek Beyond (24th), Trolls (25th), Passengers (30th), and Sully (32nd).

Racial diversity
In the previous two years, the awards had come under scrutiny for the lack of racial diversity among the nominees in major categories, which included no actors of color being nominated. After the nominees for the 89th Awards were announced on January 24, many media outlets noted the diversity of the nominations, which included a record-tying seven non-white actors and a record-setting six black actors. For the first time in the academy's history, each acting category had black actors, with three nominated in the Best Supporting Actress category and three black screenwriters nominated in the Best Adapted Screenplay category in the same year. Also nominated was one black director, the fourth in Oscar history.

The awards continued to be criticized by actors and media organizations representing non-black minorities in America. The National Hispanic Media Coalition stated that Latino actors were "not getting the opportunities to work in front of camera, and with few exceptions, in back of the camera as well." Daniel Mayeda, chair of the Asian Pacific American Media Coalition, stated that the omission of Asian actors from the nominations list (with only one actor, Dev Patel, nominated) reflected "the continued lack of real opportunities for Asians in Hollywood". A skit performed during the ceremony, in which a group of tourists enter the theater, led to criticism of host Kimmel when he was accused of mocking an Asian woman's name.

Having previously been nominated for Doubt (2008) and The Help (2011), Viola Davis became the first African-American actress to garner three Academy Award nominations. She went on to win the award, making her the first African-American to achieve the Triple Crown of Acting: winning a competitive Emmy, Tony, and Oscar in acting categories. Bradford Young became the first African-American to be nominated for Best Cinematography, while Joi McMillon became the first African-American to be nominated for Best Film Editing since Hugh A. Robertson for Midnight Cowboy, as well as the first black woman to be nominated for that award. Octavia Spencer became the first African-American actress to be nominated after having already won before. Moonlight became the first film with an all-black cast to win the Best Picture award. Additionally, the ceremony had the most black winners of the Academy Awards ever.

Travel ban controversy
Iranian director Asghar Farhadi, who won the award for Best Foreign Language Film for The Salesman, was revealed to initially be unable to attend the ceremony due to President Donald Trump's immigration ban. He boycotted the event, saying, "I have decided to not attend the Academy Awards ceremony alongside my fellow members of the cinematic community." The academy president Cheryl Boone Isaacs reacted to the travel ban, saying, "America should always be not a barrier but a beacon and each and every one of us knows that there are some empty chairs in this room which has made academy artists into activists."

Two prominent Iranian Americans – engineer Anousheh Ansari, known as the first female space tourist, and Firouz Naderi, a former director of Solar Systems Exploration at NASA – accepted Asghar Farhadi's Oscar on his behalf at the ceremony. Congratulations which had initially been tweeted to the Iranian people from the US State Department's official Persian-language Twitter account were deleted following the acceptance speech given by Firouz Naderi in which President Trump's travel ban was described as "inhumane".

Best Picture announcement error
Warren Beatty and Faye Dunaway came onstage to present the award for Best Picture, in celebration of the 50th anniversary of Bonnie and Clyde. After opening the envelope, Beatty hesitated, eventually showing it to Dunaway, who glanced at it and declared La La Land to be the winner. However, more than two minutes later, as the producers of La La Land were making their acceptance speeches, Oscar crew members came on stage and took the envelopes from those assembled, explaining to them that there had been a mistake. La La Land producer Fred Berger, having heard the news, concluded his brief speech by saying "we lost, by the way".

Beatty was then given the correct opened envelope as La La Land producer Jordan Horowitz stepped to the microphone, announced the error, stated that Moonlight had actually won the award, and took the card bearing the film's title from Beatty's hand and showed it to the camera and the audience as proof. The La La Land team, particularly Horowitz, would later be praised for their professional handling of the situation. Beatty returned to the microphone and explained that the envelope he had initially been given named Emma Stone for her actress performance in La La Land, hence his confused pause, and confirmed that Moonlight was the winner. The producers of Moonlight then came onstage, Horowitz presented the Best Picture award given to them, and they gave their acceptance speeches.

According to The Hollywood Reporter, PricewaterhouseCoopers (PwC) – the accounting firm responsible for tabulating results, preparing the envelopes, and handing them to presenters – creates two sets of envelopes, which are kept on opposite sides of the stage. It is intended that each award has one primary envelope and one backup envelope that remains with one of the PwC staff in the wings. (An emergency third set of envelopes is kept at an undisclosed location until the first two sets of envelopes are confirmed to have arrived at the Oscars ceremony location safely.) Video stills from the broadcast show that Beatty and Dunaway had been given the single remaining still-unopened backup envelope for the Best Actress award as they walked onto the stage.

PwC issued a statement apologizing for this error:

An article from The New York Times explained:

Brian Cullinan, the PwC accountant who gave the wrong envelope to Beatty, had been instructed not to use social media during the event; however, moments after handing over the envelope, he had tweeted a snapshot of Stone standing backstage. Variety published photographs of Cullinan that were taken at the time which showed him backstage while tweeting the image.

 Critical reviews 
The show received a mixed reception from media publications. Some media outlets were more critical and complained of repetitive jokes; Jeff Jensen of Entertainment Weekly complained that the show "didn't know when to stop and didn't know when to bail on stuff that wasn't working", and The Oregonian Kristi Turnquist agreed and especially noted the repeated segments featuring actors discussing their favorite films at length to be "tedious and ill-advised". Writing for Time television critic Daniel D'Addario bemoaned that, "It was unfortunate that the evening's host didn't seem to share the evening's general embrace of humanity."

Some media outlets reviewed the broadcast more positively with some praise for Kimmel. Variety television critic Sonia Saraiya praised Kimmel's performance writing that he "found a way to balance the telecast between that sensibility – the treacly self-satisfaction of sweeping orchestrals and tap dancing starlets." Chief television critics, Robert Bianco of USA Today and Frazier Moore from Associated Press applauded Kimmel's hosting saying he "was up to the challenge" while Moore added that the ceremony's induction of the montage of moviegoers shows that "Hollywood can surmount its share of walls." Brian Lowry of CNN gave an average critique of the ceremony but acclaimed Kimmel's hosting. Many critics praised the playful jabs between Kimmel and Matt Damon, who was introduced as Ben Affleck's unnamed guest as well as music being played over him.

 Rating and reception 
The American telecast on ABC drew an average of 33 million people over its length, which was a 4% decrease from the previous year. The show also earned lower Nielsen ratings compared to the previous ceremony with 22.4% of households watching over a 36 share. In addition, it received a lower 18–49 demo rating with a 9.1 rating over a 26 share. It also had the lowest U.S. viewership since the 80th ceremony in 2008, which averaged 32 million viewers. Nonetheless, it was the eighth most watched television broadcast in the United States in 2017.

In July 2017, the ceremony presentation received six nominations for the 69th Primetime Creative Arts Emmys. The following month, the ceremony won two of those nominations for Outstanding Creative Achievement In Interactive Media within an Unscripted Program and for Outstanding Directing for a Variety Special (Glenn Weiss).

"In Memoriam"
The annual "In Memoriam" segment was introduced by Jennifer Aniston, with Sara Bareilles performing a rendition of the Joni Mitchell song "Both Sides, Now" during the montage. Beforehand, Aniston paid verbal tribute to actor Bill Paxton, who died the day before the ceremony. The segment paid tribute to:

 Arthur Hiller – Director 
 Ken Adam – Production designer
 Tracy Scott – Script supervisor
 Bill Nunn – Actor
 Alice Arlen – Screenwriter
 George Kennedy – Actor
 Gene Wilder – Actor, director, producer, screenwriter
 Donald P. Harris – Film executive
 Paul Sylbert – Production designer, set decorator
 Michael Cimino – Director, producer, screenwriter
 Andrzej Wajda – Theater director
 Patty Duke – Actress
 Garry Marshall – Actor, director, producer
 Wilma Baker – Animator
 Emmanuelle Riva – Actress
 Janet Patterson – Costume designer, production designer
 Anton Yelchin – Actor
 Mary Tyler Moore – Actress
 Prince – Singer-songwriter, record producer
 Kenny Baker – Actor, musician
 John Hurt – Actor
 Jim Clark – Editor
 Norma Moriceau – Costume designer, production designer
 Fern Buchner – Makeup artist
 Kit West – Special effects artist
 Lupita Tovar – Actress
 Manlio Rocchetti – Makeup artist
 Pat Conroy – Author
 Nancy Davis Reagan – Actress, First Lady of the United States 1981-89
 Abbas Kiarostami – Director, screenwriter, producer
 William Peter Blatty – Writer, filmmaker
 Ken Howard – Actor
 Tyrus Wong – Artist
 Héctor Babenco – Actor, director, producer
 Curtis Hanson – Director, producer, screenwriter
 Marni Nixon – Singer, actress
 Ray West – Sound engineer
 Raoul Coutard – Cinematographer
 Zsa Zsa Gabor – Actress, socialite
 Antony Gibbs – Editor
 Om Puri – Actor
 Andrea Jaffe – Publicist
 Richard Portman – Sound editor
 Debbie Reynolds – Actress, singer, humanitarian
 Carrie Fisher – Actress, writer, humorist

The slide for Janet Patterson, an Australian costume designer, mistakenly used a photograph of Australian producer Jan Chapman, who is still alive.

See also

 22nd Critics' Choice Awards
 37th Golden Raspberry Awards
 59th Grammy Awards
 69th Primetime Emmy Awards
 70th British Academy Film Awards
 71st Tony Awards
 74th Golden Globe Awards
 List of submissions to the 89th Academy Awards for Best Foreign Language Film

 Notes and references 

 Notes 

 References 

 External links 

Official websites
 
 

News resources
 Oscars 2017  at BBC News
 Oscars 2017 at The Guardian''

Analysis
 Academy Awards, USA: 2017 IMDb
 2016 Academy Awards winners and History at the Filmsite.org

Other resources
 

2016 film awards
2017 awards in the United States
2017 controversies in the United States
2017 in American cinema
2017 in Los Angeles
Academy Awards ceremonies
February 2017 events in the United States
Television shows directed by Glenn Weiss
2017 television specials
Works by Jeff Loveness